The Weizenbaum Award was established in 2008 by the International Society for Ethics and Information Technology (INSEIT). It is given every two years by INSEIT's adjudication committee to an individual who has “made a significant contribution to the field of information and computer ethics, through his or her research, service, and vision.”  

It is officially named the 'INSEIT/ Joseph Weizenbaum Award in Information and Computer Ethics', "in recognition of Joseph Weizenbaum’s groundbreaking and highly influential work in computer ethics in the 1970s, which helped to shape the field as we know it today".

Winners
The Award has been won by:
2022: Philip Brey, to be awarded in CEPE 2023 in Chicago 
2020: Rafael Capurro, awarded in CEPE/IACAP 2021, Hamburg 
2019: Herman Tavani, awarded in CEPE 2019, in Norfolk Virginia 
2017: James Moor, in CEPE ETHICOMP 2017
2015: Deborah Johnson
2013: Luciano Floridi
2011: Keith W. Miller 
2010: Donald Gotterbarn 
2009: Terrell Ward Bynum. Abstract of Bynum Weizenbaum address, given at CEPE 2009

See also 

 List of computer science awards

References

External links

See the website of INSEIT, https://inseit.net, with all details of the award.
 Documentary film about Joseph Weizenbaum  ( "WEIZENBAUM. Rebel at Work." )

Philosophy awards
Computer science awards
Information science awards